Wilbur Zelinsky (21 December 1921 – 4 May 2013) was an American cultural geographer. He was most recently a professor emeritus at Pennsylvania State University. He also created the Zelinsky Model of Demographic Transition.

Background and education
An Illinoisan by birth, but a "northeasterner by choice and conviction", Zelinsky received his Bachelor's Degree and his Master's Degree from the University of Madison, Wisconsin.  He earned a PhD at University of California, Berkeley, where he was a student of Carl Sauer.

Scholarship
Zelinsky made numerous geographical studies of American popular culture, ranging from the diffusion of classical place-names to spatial patterns of personal given names and the spatial patterning of religious denominations. One of his most ambitious and imaginative projects was a provocative assessment of the impact of increasingly powerful personal preference on the spatial character of American society.

During the 1960s, along with Gordon DeJong, Warren Robinson, and Paul Baker, Zelinsky helped launch a population research center and coordinate an interdisciplinary graduate instructional program in population studies at Penn State and thus helped lay the foundation for what would become the dual-title Graduate Program in Demography.  During 1972–1973 he served as the first Director of the Population Issues Research Center (what would become the Population Research Institute at Penn State).

In 1973, Zelinsky published The Cultural Geography of the United States. In addition to his research in popular culture, he made substantial contributions in the fields of "population" and "folk geography".

Theory of First Effective Settlement 
Zelinsky's Theory of First Effective Settlement was that the dominant culture of a nation is defined by the first settlers who came to an area who are able to effect a self-perpetuating society. The theory states that these first settlers have significant impact on the social and cultural geography of the area, however few these first settlers may have been. They lay the groundwork for the following generations and are perhaps more important than the contributions of thousands of new immigrants generations later. Colin Woodard further expands upon this theory in his book, American Nations.

Recognition
 Award for Meritorious Contributions to the Field of Geography, presented by the Association of American Geographers (1996). 
 The Cullum Geographical Medal by the American Geographical Society in 2001.
 President of the AAG from 1972 to 1973.

See also 
 Geographers on Film
 Louis Hartz's "fragment thesis"

References

See also
List of geographers

1921 births
2013 deaths
American geographers
Recipients of the Cullum Geographical Medal
Presidents of the American Association of Geographers
Cultural geographers
University of California, Berkeley alumni
University of Wisconsin–Madison alumni